Hubertus Golitschek (22 October 1910 – 17 January 1969) was a German politician of the Free Democratic Party (FDP) and former member of the German Bundestag.

Life 
He was a member of the German Bundestag during the first legislative period (1949 to 1953) and again from 18 April 1956, when he succeeded Paul Luchtenberg, who had left the parliament, until 1957. In the first legislative period he had entered parliament via the Württemberg-Baden state list, in the second via the North Rhine-Westphalia state list.

Literature

References

1910 births
1969 deaths
Members of the Bundestag for Baden-Württemberg
Members of the Bundestag for North Rhine-Westphalia
Members of the Bundestag 1953–1957
Members of the Bundestag 1949–1953
Members of the Bundestag for the Free Democratic Party (Germany)